Haplogroup L3 is a human mitochondrial DNA (mtDNA) haplogroup. The clade has played a pivotal role in the early dispersal of anatomically modern humans.

It is strongly associated with the out-of-Africa migration of modern humans of about 70–50,000 years ago.
It is inherited by all modern non-African populations, as well as by some populations in Africa.

Origin 
Haplogroup L3 arose close to 70,000 years ago, near the time of the recent out-of-Africa event. This dispersal originated in East Africa and expanded to West Asia, and further to South and Southeast Asia in the course of a few millennia, and some research suggests that L3 participated in this migration out of Africa. L3 is also common amongst African Americans and Afro-Brazilians.
A 2007 estimate for the age of L3 suggested a range of 104–84,000 years ago.
More recent analyses, including Soares et al. (2012) arrive at a more recent date, of roughly 70–60,000 years ago. Soares et al. also suggest that L3 most likely expanded from East Africa into Eurasia sometime around 65–55,000 years ago years ago as part of the recent out-of-Africa event, as well as from East Africa into Central Africa from 60 to 35,000 years ago.
In 2016, Soares et al. again suggested that haplogroup L3 emerged in East Africa, leading to the Out-of-Africa migration, around 70–60,000 years ago.

Haplogroups L6 and L4 form sister clades of L3 which arose in East Africa at roughly the same time but which did not participate in the out-of-Africa migration.
The ancestral clade L3'4'6 has been estimated at 110 kya, and the L3'4 clade at 95 kya.

The possibility of an origin of L3 in Asia was also proposed by Cabrera et al. (2018) based on the similar coalescence dates of L3 and its Eurasian-distributed M and N derivative clades (ca. 70 kya), the distant location in Southeast Asia of the oldest known subclades of M and N, and the comparable age of the paternal haplogroup DE. According to this hypothesis, after an initial out-of-Africa migration of bearers of pre-L3 (L3'4*) around 125 kya, there would have been a back-migration of females carrying L3 from Eurasia to East Africa sometime after 70 kya. The hypothesis suggests that this back-migration is aligned with bearers of  paternal haplogroup E, which it also proposes to have originated in Eurasia. These new Eurasian lineages are then suggested to have largely replaced the old autochthonous male and female North-East African lineages.

According to other research, though earlier migrations out of Africa of anatomically modern humans occurred, current Eurasian populations descend instead from a later migration from Africa dated between about 65,000 and 50,000 years ago (associated with the migration out of L3).

Vai et al. (2019) suggest, from a newly discovered old and deeply-rooted branch of maternal haplogroup N found in early Neolithic North African remains, that haplogroup L3 originated in East Africa between 70,000 and 60,000 years ago, and both spread within Africa and left Africa as part of the Out-of-Africa migration, with haplogroup N diverging from it soon after (between 65,000 and 50,000 years ago) either in Arabia or possibly North Africa, and haplogroup M originating in the Middle East around the same time as N.

A study by Lipson et al. (2019) analyzing remains from the Cameroonian site of Shum Laka found them to be more similar to modern-day Pygmy peoples than to West Africans, and suggests that several other groups (including the ancestors of West Africans, East Africans and the ancestors of non-Africans) commonly derived from a human population originating in East Africa between about 80,000-60,000 years ago, which they suggest was also the source and origin zone of haplogroup L3 around 70,000 years ago.<ref>Ancient Human DNA from Shum Laka (Cameroon) in the Context of African Population History, by Lipson Mark et al., 2019 | page=5</ref>

 Distribution 

L3 is common in Northeast Africa and some other parts of East Africa, in contrast to others parts of Africa where the haplogroups L1 and L2 represent around two thirds of mtDNA lineages. L3 sublineages are also frequent in the Arabian peninsula.

L3 is subdivided into several clades, two of which spawned the macrohaplogroups M and N that are today carried by most people outside Africa. There is at least one relatively deep non-M, non-N clade of L3 outside Africa, L3f1b6, which is found at a frequency of 1% in Asturias, Spain. It diverged from African L3 lineages at least 10,000 years ago.

According to Maca-Meyer et al. (2001), "L3 is more related to Eurasian haplogroups than to the most divergent African clusters L1 and L2". L3 is the haplogroup from which all modern humans outside Africa derive. However, there is a greater diversity of major L3 branches within Africa than outside of it, the two major non-African branches being the L3 offshoots M and N.

 Subclade distribution 

L3 has seven equidistant descendants: L3a, L3b'f, L3c'd, L3e'i'k'x, L3h, M, N. Five are African, while two are associated with the Out of Africa event.
 N – Eurasia possibly due to migration from Africa, and North Africa possibly due to back-migration from Eurasia.
 M – Asia, the Mediterranean Basin, and parts of Africa due to back-migration.
 L3a – East Africa. Moderate to high frequencies found among the Sanye, Samburu, Iraqw, Yaaku, El-Molo and other minor indigenous populations from the East African Rift Valley. It is infrequent to nonexistent in Sudan and the Sahel zone.
 L3a1 – Found across Eastern Africa. Estimated age of 35.8–39.3 ka.
 L3a2 – Found across Eastern Africa. Estimated age of 48.3–57.7 ka.
 L3b'f
 L3b – Spread from East Africa in the upper paleolithic to West-Central Africa. Some subclades spread from Central Africa to East Africa with the Bantu migration.
 L3b1a – Common subclade. Estimated age of 11.7-14.8 ka.
 L3b1a2 – Subclade found in Northeast Africa, the Maghreb, and Middle East. Emerged 12–14 ka.
 L3f – Northeast Africa, Sahel, Arabian peninsula, Iberia. Gaalien, Beja
 L3f1
 L3f1a – Carried by migrants from Eastern Africa into the Sahel and Central Africa.
 L3f1b – Carried by migrants from Eastern Africa into the Sahel and Central Africa.
 L3f1b1 – Carried from Central Africa into Southern and Eastern Africa with the Bantu migration.
 L3f1b1a – Settled from East-Central Africa to Central-West Africa and into North Africa and Berber regions.
 L3f1b4 – Carried from Central Africa into Southern and Eastern Africa with the Bantu migration.
 L3f1b6 – Rare, found in Iberia.
 L3f2 – Primarily distributed in East Africa. Also found in North Africa and Central Africa.
 L3f3 – Spread from Eastern Africa to Chad and the Sahel around 8–9 ka. Found in the Chad Basin.
 L3c'd
 L3c – Extremely rare lineage with only two samples found so far in Eastern Africa and the Near East.
 L3d – Spread from East Africa in the upper paleolithic to Central Africa. Some subclades spread to East Africa with the Bantu migration. Found among the Fulani, Chadians, Ethiopians, Akan people, Mozambique, Yemenites, Egyptians, Berbers
 L3d3a1 – Primarily found in Southern Africa. Supplementary data .
 L3e'i'k'x
 L3e – Suggested to have originated in the Central Africa/Sudan region about 45,000 years ago during the upper paleolithic period. It is the most common L3 sub-clade in Bantu-speaking populations. L3e is also the most common L3 subclade amongst African Americans and Afro-Brazilians.
 L3e1 – Spread from West-Central Africa to Southwest Africa with the Bantu migration. Found in Angola (6.8%). Mozambique, Sudanese and Kikuyu of Kenya, as well as in Yemen, the Tikar of Cameroon, and among the Akan people of Ghana.
 L3e5 – Originated in the Chad Basin. Found in Algeria, as well as Burkina Faso, Nigeria, South Tunisia, South Morocco and Egypt
 L3i Almost exclusively found in East Africa.
 L3i1 
 L3i1b – Subclade is found in Yemen, Ethiopia, and among Gujarati Indians.
 L3i2 (former L3w) – Found in the Horn of Africa and Oman.
 L3k – Rare haplogroup primarily found in North Africa and the Sahel.
 L3x – Almost exclusively found in East Africa. Found among Ethiopian Oromos, Egyptians
 L3h – Almost exclusively found in East Africa.
 L3h1 – Primarily found in East Africa with branches of L3h1b1 sporadically found in the Sahel and North Africa.
 L3h2 – Found in Northeast Africa and Socotra. Split from other L3h branches as early as 65–69 ka during the middle paleolithic.

 Ancient and historic samples 
Haplogroup L3 has been observed in an ancient fossil belonging to the Pre-Pottery Neolithic B culture. L3x2a was observed in a 4,500 year old hunter-gather excavated in Mota, Ethiopia, with the ancient fossil found to be most closely related to modern Southwest Ethiopian populations. Haplogroup L3 has also been found among ancient Egyptian mummies (1/90; 1%) excavated at the Abusir el-Meleq archaeological site in Middle Egypt, with the rest deriving from Eurasian subclades, which date from the Pre-Ptolemaic/late New Kingdom and Ptolemaic periods. The Ancient Egyptian mummies bore Near eastern genomic component most closely related to modern near easterners. Additionally, haplogroup L3 has been observed in ancient Guanche fossils excavated in Gran Canaria and Tenerife on the Canary Islands, which have been radiocarbon-dated to between the 7th and 11th centuries CE. All of the clade-bearing individuals were inhumed at the Gran Canaria site, with most of these specimens found to belong to the L3b1a subclade (3/4; 75%) with the rest from both islands (8/11; 72%) deriving from Eurasian subclades. The Guanche skeletons also bore an autochthonous Maghrebi genomic component that peaks among modern Berbers, which suggests that they originated from ancestral Berber populations inhabiting northwestern Affoundnat a high ncy

A variety of L3 have been uncovered in ancient remains associated with the Pastoral Neolithic and Pastoral Iron Age of East Africa.

 Tree 
This phylogenetic tree of haplogroup L3 subclades is based on the paper by Mannis van Oven and Manfred Kayser Updated comprehensive phylogenetic tree of global human mitochondrial DNA variation and subsequent published research.

 Most Recent Common Ancestor (MRCA) 
 L1-6
 L2-6
 L2'3'4'6
 L3'4'6
 L3'4
 L3
 L3a
 L3a1
 L3a1a
 L3a1b
 L3a2
 L3a2a
 L3b'f
 L3b
 L3b1
 L3b1a
 L3b1a1
 L3b1a2
 L3b1a3
 L3b1a4
 L3b1a5
 L3b1a5a
 L3b1a6
 L3b1a7
 L3b1a7
 L3b1a8
 L3b1a9
 L3b1a9a
 L3b1a10
 L3b1a11
 L3b1b
 L3b1b1
 L3b2
 L3b2a
 L3b2a
 L3b3
 L3f
 L3f1
 L3f1a
 L3f1a1
 L3f1b
 L3f1b1
 L3f1b2
 L3f1b2a
 L3f1b3
 L3f1b4
 L3f1b4a
 L3f1b4a1
 L3f1b4b
 L3f1b4c
 L3f1b5
 L3f2
 L3f2a
 L3f2b
 L3f3
 L3f3a
 L3f3b
 L3c'd
 L3c
 L3d
 L3d1-5
 L3d1
 L3d1a
 L3d1a1
 L3d1a1a
 L3d1b
 L3d1b1
 L3d1c
 L3d1d
 199
 L3d2
 L3d5
 L3d3
 L3d3a
 L3d4
 L3d5
 L3e'i'k'x
 L3e
 L3e1
 L3e1a
 L3e1a1
 L3e1a1a
 152
 L3e1a2
 L3e1a3
 L3e1b
 L3e1c
 L3e1d
 L3e1e
 L3e2
 L3e2a
 L3e2a1
 L3e2a1a
 L3e2a1b
 L3e2a1b1
 L3e2b
 L3e2b1
 L3e2b1a
 L3e2b2
 L3e2b3
 L3e3'4'5
 L3e3'4
 L3e3
 L3e3a
 L3e3b
 L3e3b1
 L3e4
 L3e5
 L3i
 L3i1
 L3i1a
 L3i1b
 L3i2
 L3k
 L3k1
 L3x
 L3x1
 L3x1a
 L3x1a1
 L3x1a2
 L3x1b
 L3x2
 L3x2a
 L3x2a1
 L3x2a1a
 L3x2b
 L3h
 L3h1
 L3h1a
 L3h1a1
 L3h1a2
 L3h1a2a
 L3h1a2b
 L3h1b
 L3h1b1
 L3h1b1a
 L3h1b1a1
 L3h1b2
 L3h2
 M
 N

 See also 

 Genealogical DNA test
 Genetic genealogy
 Haplogroup
 Population genetics

 References 

 Notes 

 External links 
 General
 Ian Logan's Mitochondrial DNA Site
 Haplogroup L3
 Mannis van Oven's PhyloTree.org – mtDNA subtree L3
 Spread of Haplogroup L3, from National Geographic''

L3
Recent African origin of modern humans